Tommaso II may refer to:

Thomas II of Piedmont (c. 1199–1259),  Count of Piedmont from 1233 to his death
Thomas II of Saluzzo  (died 1357)